Shuffering and Shmiling is an album by Nigerian Afrobeat composer, bandleader, and multi-instrumentalist Fela Kuti, recorded in 1977 and originally released on the Nigerian Coconut label.

Reception

AllMusic stated: "While continuing along in his tradition of savvy instrumental innovation, Shuffering and Shmiling plays out with the same intensity and voracious soloing that mark other great Africa 70 performances like Confusion, Gentleman, and No Agreement; but the point of departure here is the outward remarks he makes on a touchy topic: religion."

Track listing
All compositions by Fela Kuti 
 "Shuffering and Shmiling (Vocal)" – 12:12 
 "Shuffering and Shmiling (Instrumental)" – 9:47  
 "Perambulator" – 14:30 Alternative track on 1984 French reissue

Personnel
Fela Kuti – tenor saxophone, alto saxophone, electric piano, vocals
Afrika 70
Tunde Williams, Nwokoma Ukem – trumpet
Christopher Uwaifor – alto saxophone
Lekan Animashaun – baritone saxophone
Leke Benson, Okalue Ojeah, Oghene Kologbo – guitar 
Nweke Atifoh – bass guitar
Tony Allen (aka Ladi Alabi) – drums
Ayoola Abayomi – percussion
Babajide Olaleye – maracas
Oladeinde Koffi, Addo Nettey, Shina Abiodun – congas
Alake Anikulapo Kuti, Emaruagheru Anikulapo Kuti, Fehintola Anikulapo Kuti, Ihase Anikulapo Kuti, Kevwe Anikulapo Kuti, Remi Anikulapo-Kuti, Tejumade Anikulapo Kuti – chorus
Technical
Musiliu P. Brimah – design
Kenny Adamson – cartoons

References

Fela Kuti albums
1978 albums
Afrobeat albums
Songs critical of religion